Oceanvolt is a Finnish boat electric motor manufacturer founded in 2004 by Janne Kjellman. The company was formerly known as Electric Ocean. Oceanvolt is headquartered in Vantaa, Finland.

The company currently produces two types of propulsion systems for electric boats: saildrives and shaftdrives. Oceanvolt has received several awards for its SD8.6 saildrive system, the latest being the 2013 Pittman Innovation Award given by SAIL Magazine for Oceanvolt's "compact robust design" featuring waterproof permanent magnet motor with closed circulation liquid cooling, single lever control with motor status shown by LEDs, and folding propeller which doubles as a hydrogenerator, silently extracting several kilowatts of electric power from the boat's forward motion while under sail.

Examples of boats installed with Oceanvolt electric motors

X-Yachts X-302
Finn Express 83
Maestro 40
Blue 30
Le Breton Yachts SIG 45
Aventura Catamarans Aventura 33
Sailing Uma (Pearson 36)

Awards and recognition
Oceanvolt has received a number of awards and recognitions:

2017 – DAME Award 2017 Category Winner (Machinery, Propulsion, Mechanical and Electrical Systems and Fittings): Oceanvolt ServoProp 
2013 – 2013 Pittman Innovation Award from SAIL Magazine: Oceanvolt SD8.6 and SD15
2012 – DAME Award 2012 Special Mention: Machine, propulsion, mechanical and electrical systems and fittings for the Oceanvolt SD8.6
2012 – Clean Design Award 2012: Oceanvolt SD8.6

External links
Company website
Oceanvolt's Facebook
Oceanvolt's Instagram
Oceanvolt's Twitter
Oceanvolt's Youtube

References 

Marine engine manufacturers
Engine manufacturers of Finland
Electric boats